Patten Mills is an unincorporated community in Washington County, in the U.S. state of Ohio.

History
A post office was established at Patten Mills in 1866, and remained in operation until 1906. The namesake Patten's Mills was a mill on Wolf Creek.

References

Unincorporated communities in Washington County, Ohio
Unincorporated communities in Ohio